Sócrates Emanuel Adolfo Pedro (born 29 August 1992) is a Portuguese footballer who plays as a forward for Indian club Churchill Brothers.

Club career

Portugal and Angola
Born in Lisbon, Portugal, Sócrates has made into the squads of Portuguese clubs Cova Piedade, Clube Oriental Lissabon, Cova Piedade, Tourizense, Casa Pia, Pinhalnovense in Campeonato de Portugal and Angolan side Interclube in Girabola.

He has also made a couple of appearances for Lusitano in the Taça de Portugal in 2019-20 season.

Pedro made initial professional appearance with the Portuguese side Sertanense in the Campeonato de Portugal. He continued his career with another Portuguese side Lusitano and made maiden appearance for the club as well.

India
In 2020, Sócrates penned a deal with the I-League club Churchill Brothers and appeared nine times for the club before the league was stopped due to the COVID-19 pandemic in India.

Honours
 Campeonato de Portugal: 2013–14 (Runners-up)

References

1992 births
Living people
Portuguese footballers
Footballers from Lisbon
Association football forwards
Clube Olímpico do Montijo players
C.D. Cova da Piedade players
Clube Oriental de Lisboa players
G.D. Interclube players
G.D. Tourizense players
Casa Pia A.C. players
C.D. Pinhalnovense players
Sertanense F.C. players
Lusitano G.C. players
Churchill Brothers FC Goa players
Segunda Divisão players
Liga Portugal 2 players
Campeonato de Portugal (league) players
Girabola players
I-League players
Portuguese expatriate footballers
Expatriate footballers in Angola
Portuguese expatriate sportspeople in Angola
Expatriate footballers in India
Portuguese expatriate sportspeople in India